David Questiers (2 February 1623 - 17 April 1663) was a Dutch poet.  Questiers was born and died in Amsterdam, and was the brother of the noted poet Catharina Questiers.

References
Profile in the Digital library for Dutch literature

1623 births
1663 deaths
Dutch male poets
Writers from Amsterdam